Stuart McLean, or a variation thereof, may refer to:

 Stuart McLean (1948–2017), Canadian broadcaster
 Stuart McLean (footballer, born 1923) (1923–2011), Scottish footballer, Inside Forward for Rotherham United
 Stuart McLean (footballer) (born 1955), Scottish footballer
 Stewart McLean (1913–1996), Canadian politician
 Stewart McLean (actor) (1941–2006), Scottish actor